Johannes “Johnny” Gottselig (June 24, 1905 – May 15, 1986) was a professional ice hockey left winger who played 16 seasons for the Chicago Black Hawks of the National Hockey League (NHL) between 1928 and 1945. He was the second player born in the Russian Empire to play in the NHL. Emil Iverson was the first European-born Chicago Blackhawks head coach in 1932 (Copenhagen, Denmark) and John became the second approximately 15 years later.

He was the second European-born captain of a cup-winning team in the league's history (Scotland-born Charlie Gardiner was the first in 1934). He won two Stanley Cups in his playing career: in 1934, and 1938 (as captain). He was also with Chicago in 1961, as Director of Public Relations, when the Black Hawks won their third Stanley Cup. Gottselig was included on the team, but his name was not engraved onto the Stanley Cup.

Background
Gottselig was born along the banks of Dnieper River in a tiny German Catholic village of Klosterdorf in the Swedish district in the Kherson Governorate of the Russian Empire and emigrated to Canada the same year. He grew up in Regina, Saskatchewan. In later years, he would say he was from the better-known city of Odessa which was the largest centre in the general vicinity of his birthplace. His parents were Albert Gottselig and Margarethe Weber.

Career
He played junior hockey with the Regina Pats before joining Chicago. Gottselig's entire NHL career was with Chicago, playing 589 career NHL games, scoring 176 goals and 195 assists for 371 points. After his hockey playing career was finished, he became the team's head coach. After coaching, he stayed on as the team's Director of Public Relations.

Gottselig also served for several years as a manager of women's baseball teams in the All-American Girls Professional Baseball League. He guided the Racine Belles in 1943–1944, the Peoria Redwings in 1947 and the Kenosha Comets in 1949–1950. He later became an executive with the Elmhurst Chicago Stone Company.

Career statistics

Coaching record

References

External links
 

1905 births
1986 deaths
All-American Girls Professional Baseball League managers
Burials at Calvary Cemetery (Evanston, Illinois)
Canadian expatriate ice hockey players in the United States
Canadian ice hockey left wingers
Chicago Blackhawks announcers
Chicago Blackhawks captains
Chicago Blackhawks players
Ice hockey people from Saskatchewan
Kansas City Americans players
National Hockey League broadcasters
People from Kherson Oblast
Regina Capitals players
Regina Pats players
Stanley Cup champions
Emigrants from the Russian Empire to Canada